Microcassiope is a genus of crabs in the family Xanthidae, containing the following species:

 Microcassiope granulimana (Stimpson, 1871)
 Microcassiope minor (Dana, 1852)
 Microcassiope orientalis Takeda & Miyake, 1969
 Microcassiope taboguillensis (Rathbun, 1907)
 Microcassiope xantusii (Stimpson, 1871)

References

Xanthoidea